El Cuay is a corregimiento in Santa Fé District, Veraguas Province, Panama with a population of 1,486 as of 2010. Its population as of 1990 was 1,558; its population as of 2000 was 1,588.

References

Corregimientos of Veraguas Province